Thomas Conolly may refer to:

 Thomas Conolly (1738–1803), MP for Malmesbury, Chichester, Ballyshannon and County Londonderry
 Thomas Conolly (1823–1876), MP for Donegal

See also
Thomas Connolly (disambiguation)
Thomas Connelly (disambiguation)